Paappi Appacha is a 2010 Indian Malayalam-language action comedy film written and directed by Eldho mathai, starring Dileep and Innocent. The film released in April 2010 in Kerala on more than 70 screens. The film also marked the directorial debut of Mamas K. Chandran. Leading characters in the film have a similar life style of the comedians in the song "Paappi Appacha" in the 1972 Prem Nazir starrer Mayiladumkunnu.

Plot 
Paappi Appacha is the story of a father and son duo, Nirappel Mathai and Nirappel Paappi, shared a friendly rapport. They live like close friends and they get into all sorts of mischiefs in their village, Ithirikkandam, accompanied by Paappi's aide Kuttaappi. Even though the villagers are very fond of the Nirappel family, the adept father and son duo have a hard time keeping up their image of a prosperous family. Annie works as a teacher in a local school and Paappi is in love with her, though Annie does not like him. It is because despite being very close friends, she was humiliated by Paappi himself, in one of their school days. Also Paappi quit schooling while at the 9th grade, leaving him an illiterate image, just like his father, in front of her. Paappi's mother Maria and younger sister Mollykkutty also like Annie very much and wants her as Paappi's wife. But the foolishly casual lifestyle of the Nirappel men caps the ladies' wish into a mere distant dream.

In the meantime, a businessman named Manikkunju comes to the village, which creates a lot of problems with the Nirappel men. Meanwhile, Annie, with support of Shashankan Muthalali, who is rather inept, yet envious about the apparent prosperity of the Nirappel family, and fellow school colleague Dasan maash stands against Paappi in Panchayath election, to teach Paappi a lesson about social responsibility. Despite Paappi's best efforts, Annie wins the seat and becomes Panchayath President, leaving Paappi in a further shameful, yet a humble image in front of her.

Annie then gets a marriage proposal. Hearing this Paappi goes to Annie's house who see him jumping to catch a glimpse of the proceedings. Tony Issac her groom-to-be tells he expects a positive response from Annie and leaves. Later she gets a call from Tony's mother who verbally abuses her, as her son was allegedly brutally assaulted by Paappi. Annie, furious about this, goes to Mathai's house and tells all this. She even tells that Paappi will even try to kill Mathai. Influenced by Annie's words, Mathai believes that Paappi won't do anything like thing. Paappi, outrageous about Annie's outburst, goes verbally rough to Annie during a school function and in a fit of rage shouts that he did trash her marriage proposal. In a fit of shame and rage, Mathai slaps Paappi and a crack is openly formed in their relation. Things get worse when the school run by Mathai's family is mysteriously burned down and Mathai completely disowns Paappi, thinking he is the culprit, also trying to commit patricide in the process. Shashankan, seeing this as a golden opportunity to rip apart the Nirappel family, steps in and joins side with Nirappel Mathai, apparently putting Paappi out of the good image. In a fit of revenge, Paappi tries to shut down Nirappel financial institution now in the hands of Mathai, through a word of mouth on bankruptcy. However, Mathai, who instantly sees the picture, turns the tables, by publicly lying that it was Paappi who is legally due to settle the financial deals. Unable to handle the sudden turn of events, Paappi and Kuttaappi escape from the scene. In the end, Shashankan occupies Paappi's place as Mathai's trustee, much to the shock of Paappi and Kuttaappi.

In the second half of the movie Paappi is trying to survive on his own, with Kuttaappi by his side, along with attempting to give his father Mathai a hard time. Maria and Mollykkutty still root for Paappi, much to Mathai's dismay. Paappi obtains a legal freeze on Mathai's financial deals, rendering Mathai in a financial lockdown. Finally, Mathai is forced to sell off Maria's land. But Paappi, for the deep love for his mother, foils the plot by getting the land to be designated as being of archeological value, although it is not actually. This setup renders the land unable to be sold.

On a rainy day, Annie happens to meet Paappi outside the church. There Paappi tells Annie that he was not the one responsible for disrupting Annie's wedding proposal, and that it was nothing more than his state of agitation which led to the unpleasant events that followed. Then and there Annie begins to develop a love interest in Paappi, who has now come clean. In the meantime, Manikkunju approaches the financially depressed Mathai for an alliance on the pretext of a friendly reconciliation, but Mathai was shrewd enough to see through the plan and turns down the offer, much to Manikkunju's rising hatred towards Mathai.

The villagers are now worried that the city market once run efficiently by Paappi and Mathai together doesn't function the same anymore, and the villagers fear the market's doom if taken over by the hostile Manikkunju. Annie who had earlier taken a diary from Paappi regarding the plans he had for the Panchayath if he wins the election, uses a scheme of a Farmers' Co-operative Society buying the market items from farmers and selling it giving the profit to the farmers. She shares this idea with Dasan Maash who is also seemed to be excited about this.

The following night, a drunken duo Mathai and Shashankan, while walking on the roadside, are attacked by a person with a sword. Mathai is injured while Shashankan escapes as the neighbours hear the commotion and come out. The wounded Mathai tells that Paappi did it. Everyone believes that Paappi is behind the attempt. The police tries to catch Paappi for attacking Mathai and kidnapping Annie. But Paappi manages to escapes and he saves Shashankan from some goons who tries to kill him. But, Shashankan runs away from Paappi as he was thinking that Shashankan stabbed Mathai, kidnapped Annie and blamed Paappi for everything. Paappi catches him and Shashankan tells that he had some enmity against them but he didn't want to kill them and reveals the real person who stabbed Mathai.

Soon it was revealed that Annie was actually kidnapped by Manikkunju and his men. In a struggle, she tries to escape and finds Dasan Maash and asks for help. Manikkunju arrives and soon it turns out that he is Dasan Maash's business partner. Dasan Maash reveals to Annie that he had a heavy grudge against Paappi and Mathai, who are now doing business on the land which was actually his own, but now bought by Mathai long time ago. Dasan Maash's original name is revealed to be Sivadasa Kaimal. His father, Radhakrishna Kaimal, once way prosperous than the then pauper Nirappel Mathai himself, had to sell it off to the Nirappel family, due to Kaimal's extravagant lifestyle. Dasan's main plan was to break Paappi's and Mathai's friendly rapport and during that time he has been obsessed with Annie since the very first time he saw her, and even though he knows Annie loves Paappi, he still craves for her body. He tried to separate them by making Annie to stand against Paappi in the election and sending goons to kill Paappi. But the plan got failed. He then executed his plan to disrupted Annie's marriage proposal in Paappi's style and setting fire on the school to break Paappi's and Mathai's relationship. Manikkunju helps in most of his plan. Dasan was the one who attacked Mathai with Manikkunju. Only Shashankan witnessed this and Dasan tries to kill Shashankan so that he won't reveal the truth to anyone, but he escapes. The goons who tried to kill Shashankan were Dasan's men. As Dasan proceeds to molest her, Paappi comes there, saves her and hits Dasan, Manikkunju and their men. But Manikkunju beats Paappi very badly. Meanwhile, Mathai also arrives there learning the entire truth. He tells to beat them back if he is Mathai's son, which he does bravely. In the end, against Paappi's rage to kill Dasan, he has to let him go because of Mathai's fatherly plea. When the movie is about to be done, Shashankan comes clean and asks Paappi if he loves his father or mother and he was about to say father but his father says "Annie!" and they end the movie happily.

Cast

 Dileep as Nirappel Paappi
 Innocent as Nirappel Mathai
 Kavya Madhavan as Annie
 Ashokan as Shashankan Muthalali
 Dharmajan Bolgatty as Kuttappi (Paappi's driver)
 Rajeev Parameshwar as Shivadasa Kaimal (Dasan Maash)
 Suresh Krishna as Manikkunju
 Kalabhavan Shajohn as Shashankan's assistant
 K.P.A.C. Lalitha as Mariya (Paappi's mother)
 Manjusha Sajish aka Manju Raghavan as Mollykkutty (Paappi's sister)
 Shobha Mohan as Annie's mother
 Kochu Preman as Keshavan
 Machan Varghese as Mathai, a villager
 Narayanankutty as Nicholas, a villager
 Manikandan Pattambi as Thomas, a villager
 Abu Salim as CI Marcose
 Manju Satheesh as teacher
 Thesni Khan as Shylaja teacher
 Majeed Edavanakad as Headmaster
 Aadithyan Ajayan
 Jolly Eshow

Production 
The film was mainly shot at various locations in Thodupuzha.

Release 
The film debuted in 73 releasing stations on 14 April 2010 (the day of Vishu, the Kerala New Year festival)

Box office
The film was a commercial success.

Soundtrack 

The film's soundtrack contains four songs, all composed by Vidyasagar. The lyrics were written by Gireesh Puthenchery and Vayalar Sarathchandra Varma. This was one of the last films of Giressh Puthenchery as a lyricist, due to his untimely death in February 2010.

References

External links 
 
 
 http://www.nowrunning.com/movie/7267/malayalam/pappy-appacha/index.htm
 
 https://web.archive.org/web/20110721154154/http://cinemacomments.blog.co.in/2010/05/09/paappi-appacha/ - Movie Review

2010s Malayalam-language films
2010 romantic comedy films
2010 films
2010 directorial debut films
Films scored by Vidyasagar
Indian romantic comedy films